Solstice Live! is a live album released by Paul Winter in 1993. The album is a recording of a performance of Paul Winter's annual Winter Solstice Celebration, which takes place in the Cathedral of St. John the Divine in New York City. The concert is a contemporary celebration of the longest night of the year, and the return of the sun. It features contemporary symbols for various parts of the celebration created by Winter. These symbols are both an artistic visual representation of something as well as a musical instrument played on during the performance. These symbols include the Sun Gong, a giant gong that is hit with yellow and red light, and risen 100 feet to the top of the cathedral ceiling, along with its player. Another is the Solstice Tree, a large sculpture of an evergreen tree, upon which is hung various cymbals, bells, chimes and gongs. The performance always features the Paul Winter Consort, and special guest musicians that Paul Winter has met or collaborated with, making it a celebration of the world's people and their music.

Track listing
 "Fanfare"
 "Tomorrow Is My Dancing Day"
 "Fog On The Hill"
 "Shaman"
 "Boon Song"
 "Buena Nueva - Good News"
 "Nevaga - Neva River"
 "Highland Heaven"
 "The Sparrow"
 "Hodie - Good People All"
 "TURNING POINT SUITE: Prelude: Marchade San Benito - Processional March of San Benito"
 "The Night Forest"
 "River"
 "Trickster"
 "Return Of The Sun"
 "Solstice Chant"
 "Christmas Day Is Come/Duet For The Longest Night"
 "Down In Belgorod"
 "Minuit - Midnight/Adeste Fidelis"

Personnel
Paul Winter Consort
 Paul Winter – soprano sax
 Rhonda Larson – flute
 Mark Perchanok – heckelphone
 Paul Halley – piano, pipe organ
 Dorothy Papadakos – pipe organ
 Eugene Friesen – cello
 Russ Landau – bass
 Eliot Wadopian – double bass
 Jamey Haddad – drums, percussion
 Ted Moore – drums
 Café – congas, percussion
 Sammy Figueroa – congas, percussion
 Gordon Gottlieb – timpani, Brazilian surdos, percussion
 Glen Velez – frame drum, percussion

Guests
 Andes Manta
 Nando Casals
 Dimitri Donders
 Kecia Lewis-Evans
 Nóirín Ní Riain
 Dmitri Pokrovsky Ensemble

References

"Solstice Live!" Living Music.

1993 live albums
Living Music albums
Paul Winter albums